Karsten Boysen (born 1 March 1938) is a Venezuelan sailor. He competed at the 1964 Summer Olympics and the 1968 Summer Olympics.

References

External links
 

1938 births
Living people
Venezuelan male sailors (sport)
Olympic sailors of Venezuela
Sailors at the 1964 Summer Olympics – Finn
Sailors at the 1968 Summer Olympics – Finn
Sportspeople from Kiel